Gillon Block is an historic commercial building at 189 Main Street in Milford, Massachusetts.  The four story brick building was built in 1888 by Patrick Gillon, the owner of a bottle manufacturing company.  It has a complex facade, divided into seven sections, with a central projecting section topped by a tower with a coppered onion dome.  Matching sections at the center sections of the three on either side are articulated by piers and topped by gabled parapets.  The building houses stores on the first floor and offices on the upper floors.

The block was listed on the National Register of Historic Places in 1982.

See also
National Register of Historic Places listings in Worcester County, Massachusetts

References

Commercial blocks on the National Register of Historic Places in Massachusetts
Buildings and structures in Worcester County, Massachusetts
Commercial buildings completed in 1888
National Register of Historic Places in Worcester County, Massachusetts
Milford, Massachusetts